R/V Roger Revelle is a  operated by Scripps Institution of Oceanography under charter agreement with Office of Naval Research as part of the University-National Oceanographic Laboratory System (UNOLS) fleet. The ship is named after Roger Randall Dougan Revelle, who was essential to the incorporation of Scripps into the University of California San Diego.

Construction and characteristics
Roger Revelle was built by Halter Marine Inc., Gulfport, Mississippi. She was laid down on 9 December 1993 and launched on 20 April 1995. She was delivered to the U.S. Navy 11 June 1996, as RV Roger Revelle (T-AGOR-24), a Thomas G. Thompson-class oceanographic research ship. Her maiden voyage was from Gulfport to San Diego, California, the following month. She is a sister ship to the R/V Thomas G. Thompson (UW), NOAAS Ronald H. Brown (NOAA) and R/V Atlantis (Woods Hole), all built upon the same design.

The Revelle underwent a $60 million refit between 2019 and 2020, where over six miles of cable were replaced. The refit overhauled the power systems, ballast management, bow thruster (to a new retractable ZF thruster), refurbished the A-frame, and added a scientific gondola.

Navigational capabilities 
 GPS Furuno GP150 (2)
 ADU GPS Ashtech Attitude-sensing System
 RADAR Sperry 3 cm, 10 cm
 Acoustic Positioning System Nautronix 916 SBL/LBL
 Fathometer Furuno FV 700 50 kHz
 Doppler Speed Log – ODEC 200 kHz
 Doppler Speed Log – EDO 600 kHz
 Dynamic Positioning - Kongsberg DP-System
 ADF - Kongsberg-Simrad Taiyo
 Gyro - Sperry MK 37 (2)

Oceanographic data acquisition sensors and processing systems 
As of 2014, the ship comes standard with these set of Oceanographic sensors; with provisions, space, and modularity to add a variety of other scientific sensors and equipment.
 Furuno FAR2117 X-Band Radar coupled to a WAMOS wave and surface current monitoring system.  Configured to 1.5 nm range, with antenna rotation speed at 42 rpm.
 RD Instruments 75 & 150 kHz broadband Acoustic Doppler Currents Profiler (ADCP), running University of Hawaii SOEST's UHDAS software.
 UCSD Ocean Physics Group 50 and 140 kHz High-Resolution Hydrographic Doppler Sonar System (HDSS), using UCSD-OPG's HDSS software (similar in function to the ADCP).
 Bell BGM-3 Gravimeter, with LaCoste & Romberg portable gravimeter for gravity tie and calibration.
 Turo Quoll Fast Deep XBT system
 Kongsberg EM122 multibeam echosounder sonar (bathymetry)
 Knudsen Engineering 3260 and 320B/R 3.5 & 12 kHz singlebeam echosounder sub-bottom profiler.
 iXBlue Hydrins, and Phins-III are the main Motion Reference Units (Gyro's) used by the ship's standard Oceanographic sensors, with feeds available throughout the ship in UDP or Serial formats.
 Trimble SPS351, Furuno GP150, and Ashtech ADU3 GPS' provide redundant and accurate GPS and attitude information at various frequencies for the science equipment.  These feeds can be accessed throughout the vessel by science teams via either UDP or Serial.
 Trimble GPS and End Run time servers that provides NTP GPS-derived time, IRG-B and 1 PPS synronization along with other time measurements
 MET; a comprehensive meteorological system and software suite developed by Scripps Institution of Oceanography, providing wind speed/direction, relative humidity, barometric pressure, long and shortwave radiation, air temperature, sea surface temperature, and precipitation.  The software also provides a winch load data during towing, dredging, and CTD operations.

Winches 
 Markey DUTW-9-11 traction-drum winch with dual storage drums. Normally 15,000 m of 9/16" 3 x 19 trawl wire is on one storage drum and 10,000 m of 0.680" electromechanical cable on the other. Wires over the side lead to A-frame or main deck crane. Capable of fiber optic cable through A-frame.
 Markey DESH 5 hydrographic winch, with 10,000 m of 1/4" 3 x 19 hydrographic wire, or 10,000 m of 0.322" three-conductor electromechanical CTD cable on Lebus grooving.  Wire drums are interchangeable, one is stowed while the other is in use.  Wires lead over starboard side via retractable hydroboom.
 CAST-6/Allied Crane CTD Handling System with 10,000 m of 0.322" three-conductor electromechanical CTD cable on Lebus grooving.  Wire leads over starboard side via Allied crane articulating boom.
 Assorted portable winch and wire combinations available for cruise-specific requirements.

Support equipment 
 Primary, North American cranes (3) on starboard quarter, main deck and on port side, 02 level.
 Morgan Marine cranes (2), normally on foredeck and at other locations to suit mission.
 Fritz-Culver A-frame at stern, retractable hydroboom on starboard side by staging bay door.
 Blue Extension crane on starboard 01 aft of rescue boat davit.
 Extensive (~3,000) bolt down fittings for securing removable equipment on all decks and inside laboratories (2' X 2' pattern).  1" sockets outside, 1/2" sockets inside.
 Uncontaminated seawater supply to all labs (except computer lab).
 Through-hull instrument well in staging bay, nominal 24" diam. tube.
 Two installed Price A300 compressors provide 1850 psi air for seismic work.

Computing environment 
Shipboard computer systems consists of a cluster of Linux (CentOS) servers capable of up to 20 Terabytes of available and expandable cruise data storage in RAID6 configuration.  The cluster provides email, intranet, NAS, DHCP, proxy, SAMBA, Active Directory, data processing, and data procurement services.  Internet is provided using a combination of UNOLS-designed proprietary satellite system (C-Band), shore cellular network (3G, 4G/LTE), and/or Inmarsat FleetBroadband (L-Band).  In addition to the cluster, there is a wide array of data acquisition computers hooked up to a modular display array.  All live processed data from the ship's standard set of acquisition systems is displayed on the array, and provide live feedback of the ship's underway data.  There are repeating displays in the main lab, and hydro lab that shows MET and navigation data.

The various Windows, Linux, and Mac acquisition machines perform data acquisition, archiving and processing functions on many of the permanently installed data collection systems. All data is centralized in the cluster.

Associated cruises 
The Revelle's first research cruise was for the 1996 CalCOFI cruise, which she commonly undertakes on an annual basis.

Revelle and her sister ships are required for maintenance on the OOI Regional Cabled Array off the west coast of the United States. The Revelle is capable of deploying a 36-niskin rosette and has participated in several sections of the NSF GO-SHIP and GEOTRACES hydrography programs. She is large enough to accommodate for an ROV and associated equipment, thereby also making her capable of engineering cruises and exploration for hydrothermal vents. This included portions of the NOAA vents program (1980 - 2013).

With a large operational range, she is used to deploy floats (ARGO, GO-BGC, SOCCOM, etc.) in remote areas.

References

External links
  Roger Revelle at UCSD
 NavSource Online: Service Ship Photo Archive - RV Roger Revelle (T-AGOR-24)
 The Research Vessel Roger Revelle
 Roger Revelle deck plans

 

University-National Oceanographic Laboratory System research vessels
Thomas G. Thompson-class oceanographic research ships
Ships built in Gulfport, Mississippi
1995 ships
Scripps Institution of Oceanography